Monreal del Llano is a municipality in located in the province of Cuenca, Castile-La Mancha, Spain. It has a population of 74 (2014).

Municipalities in the Province of Cuenca